Dicranoptycha elsa is a species of limoniid crane fly in the family Limoniidae.

References

Limoniidae
Articles created by Qbugbot
Insects described in 1929